Amari Bailey (born February 17, 2004) is an American college basketball player for the  UCLA Bruins of the Pac-12 Conference. He was a consensus five-star recruit and one of the top players in the 2022 class.

Early life and high school career
Born in New Orleans, Bailey grew up in Chicago, and was raised by a single mother. He and his mother were featured in Bringing Up Ballers, a Lifetime reality show that follows Chicago-area entrepreneur mothers of basketball players. He moved to the Los Angeles area to play for Sierra Canyon School in Chatsworth. As a freshman, Bailey helped his team win the California Interscholastic Federation Open Division state title. He had nine points, three rebounds and four assists in a 76–52 finals win over Sheldon. As a junior, he averaged 29.2 points, 9.1 rebounds and 6.5 assists per game. He was named California Mr. Basketball, Los Angeles Daily News All-Area Player of the Year and Gold Coast League MVP.

Recruiting
Bailey was a consensus five-star recruit and one of the top players in the 2022 class, according to major recruiting services. At age 13, while in eighth grade, he committed to playing college basketball for DePaul, but he decommitted before starting high school. He later committed to UCLA as a high school freshman, before decommitting again eight months later when their coach, Steve Alford, was fired. On February 17, 2021, Bailey recommitted to UCLA and their new coach, Mick Cronin. 247Sports ranked Bailey as the third-best combo guard in his high school class.

College career
In his college debut, Bailey scored 10 points against Sacramento State. He began the 2022–23 season winning the Pac-12 Conference's freshman of the week award twice. He was injured against Kentucky when the Wildcats' Oscar Tshiebwe stepped on his left foot.  Bailey aggravated the injury the following game against UC Davis. From December 30, 2022, against Washington State, until January 26, 2023, he was sidelined for seven games due to discomfort in his foot. On February 9, Bailey scored 24 points in a win against Oregon State. He was named to the Pac-12 All-Freshman Team. His scoring increased after teammate Jaylen Clark suffered a season-ending leg injury in the regular-season finale against Arizona. In the Bruins' opener in the 2023 Pac-12 tournament, Bailey scored a career-high 26 points in a win over Colorado. He had 19 points and seven rebounds in the finals, which UCLA lost 61–59 to Arizona.

National team career
Bailey represented the United States at the 2019 FIBA Under-16 Americas Championship in Brazil. He averaged 13.2 points, 4.2 rebounds and three assists per game, helping his team win the gold medal.

Personal life
Bailey's father, Aaron, played football for the Indianapolis Colts of the National Football League.

References

External links
UCLA Bruins bio
Sierra Canyon Trailblazers bio
USA Basketball bio

2004 births
Living people
American men's basketball players
Basketball players from Chicago
Basketball players from Los Angeles
McDonald's High School All-Americans
Shooting guards
Sierra Canyon School alumni
UCLA Bruins men's basketball players